The Berge Emperor was a supertanker built in 1975, in Japan, by Mitsui. At  she was one of the world's longest ships.

She was launched on 30 August 1975. The ship was owned by Bergesen d.y. & Co. but was sold to Maastow BV in 1985, and renamed Emperor. The ship was scrapped at Kaohsiung, Taiwan, on 30 March 1986.

See also
List of longest ships
TI-class supertanker
Freedom Ship

References

Ships built by Mitsui Engineering and Shipbuilding
Oil tankers
1975 ships
Tankers of Norway